Diso is a town and comune in the   province of Lecce in the Apulia region of south-east Italy.

It has existed since the early 11th century, and features several churches, buildings and squares.

References

Cities and towns in Apulia
Localities of Salento